Rahul Hazarika (born 31 May 1993) is an Indian cricketer who plays for Assam. He is a left-handed opening batter. Hazarika made his first-class debut on 7 November 2015 against Haryana at Rohtak in the 2015–16 Ranji Trophy. He made his List A debut on 25 September 2019, for Assam in the 2019–20 Vijay Hazare Trophy.

References

External links
 

1993 births
Living people
Indian cricketers
Assam cricketers
Cricketers from Guwahati